Roger Harry Daltrey  (born 1 March 1944) is an English singer, musician, songwriter, and actor. He is a co-founder and the lead singer of the rock band the Who.

Daltrey's hit songs with the Who include "My Generation", "Pinball Wizard", "Won't Get Fooled Again", "Baba O'Riley" and "You Better You Bet". He began his solo career in 1973, while still a member of the Who. Since then he has released ten solo studio albums, five compilation albums, and one live album. His solo hits include "Giving It All Away", "Walking the Dog", "Written on the Wind", "Free Me", "Without Your Love" and "Under a Raging Moon".

The Who are considered one of the most influential rock bands of the 20th century and have sold over 100 million records worldwide. As a member of the band, Daltrey received a Lifetime achievement award from the British Phonographic Industry in 1988, and from the Grammy Foundation in 2001. He was inducted into the Rock and Roll Hall of Fame in 1990, and the UK Music Hall of Fame in 2005. He and Pete Townshend received Kennedy Center Honors in 2008 and The George and Ira Gershwin Award for Lifetime Musical Achievement at UCLA on 21 May 2016. Daltrey has also been an actor and film producer, with roles in films, theatre, and television. Planet Rock listeners voted him rock's fifth-greatest voice in 2009, and he was ranked number 61 on Rolling Stones list of the 100 greatest singers of all time in 2010.

Early life

Daltrey was born on 1 March 1944, in Hammersmith Hospital, East Acton, London, the eldest of three children of Harry and Irene Daltrey. Harry Daltrey was an insurance clerk who was called up to fight in the Second World War, leaving three-month-old Roger and his mother to be evacuated to a farm in Scotland.

Daltrey attended Victoria Primary School and then Acton County Grammar School along with Pete Townshend and John Entwistle. He showed academic promise in the English state school system, placed at the top of his class on the eleven-plus examination that led to his enrolment at Acton County Grammar School.

Daltrey made his first guitar, from a block of wood, in 1957, a cherry red Stratocaster replica, and joined a skiffle band called the Detours, who were in need of a lead singer. They told him that he had to bring a guitar, and within a few weeks he showed up with it. When his father bought him an Epiphone guitar in 1959, he became the lead guitarist for the band and was soon expelled from school for smoking tobacco. Townshend wrote in his autobiography, "until he was expelled Roger had been a good pupil."

Early on, Daltrey was the band's leader, earning a reputation for using his fists to exercise discipline, when needed. According to Townshend, Daltrey "ran things the way he wanted. If you argued with him, you usually got a bunch of fives [a hard punch]". Daltrey would explain, later in life, that his harsh approach came from the tough neighbourhood he grew up in, where most arguments and debates were resolved with a fight.

In 1964, the band discovered another band performing as the Detours and discussed changing their name. Townshend suggested "the Hair" and Townshend's roommate Richard Barnes suggested "The Who". The next morning, Daltrey made the decision for the band, saying "It's The Who, innit?"

The Who

Overview 
With the band's first hit single ("I Can't Explain") and record deal in early 1965, Townshend began writing original material and Daltrey's dominance of the band began to decrease.

The other members of the Who fired Daltrey from the band in late 1965 after he beat up their drummer Keith Moon for supplying illegal drugs to Townshend and Entwistle, causing him to re-examine his methods of dealing with people. A week later, Daltrey was admitted back to the band, but was told he'd be on probation. He promised that there would be no more violent outbursts or assaults. Daltrey recalled, "I thought if I lost the band I was dead. If I didn't stick with the Who, I would be a sheet metal worker for the rest of my life."

The band's second single, "Anyway, Anyhow, Anywhere", was a collaboration between Daltrey and Townshend. As Townshend developed into one of rock's most accomplished composers, Daltrey gained a reputation as a singer and front-man. The Who's stage act was energetic, and Daltrey's habit of swinging the microphone around by its cord on stage became his signature move. Daltrey's Townshend-inspired stuttering expression of youthful anger, frustration, and arrogance in the band's breakthrough single, "My Generation", captured the revolutionary feeling of the 1960s for many young people around the world and became the band's trademark. Later, his scream near the end of "Won't Get Fooled Again" became a defining moment in rock and roll.

By 1973, Daltrey was experiencing considerable success with his solo projects and acting roles. While other members of the band worked on recording the music for Quadrophenia, Daltrey used some of this time to check The Who's financial books. He found they had fallen into disarray under the management of Kit Lambert and Chris Stamp. Lambert was also Pete Townshend's artistic mentor, and challenging him led to renewed tension within the band. During a filming session (in an incident that Daltrey claimed was overblown) Townshend and Daltrey argued over the schedule. Townshend hit Daltrey over the head with his guitar, and Daltrey responded by knocking Townshend unconscious with a single blow.

With each of The Who's milestone achievements, Tommy, Who's Next, and Quadrophenia, Daltrey was the face and voice of the band as they defined themselves as the ultimate rebels in a generation of change. When Ken Russell's adaptation of Tommy appeared as a feature film in 1975, Daltrey played the lead role, and was nominated for a Golden Globe Award for "Best Acting Debut in a Motion Picture" and appeared on the cover of Rolling Stone magazine on 10 April 1975. He afterward worked with Russell again, starring as Franz Liszt in Lisztomania. Daltrey worked with Rick Wakeman on the soundtrack to this film.

The Who continued after the death of their drummer Keith Moon in 1978, but tension continued to rise as Daltrey felt that new drummer Kenney Jones was the wrong choice. The Who broke up in 1983 when Townshend felt that he was no longer able to write for the band.

The Who returned in 1989 with their 25th Anniversary Tour, which was also the 20th anniversary of their rock opera Tommy. The tour featured a large backing band, and guest appearances by Steve Winwood, Patti LaBelle, Phil Collins, Elton John, and Billy Idol. In spite of an abdominal hemangioma (later removed by surgery), Daltrey managed to complete the tour.

In 1996, Pete Townshend was approached to produce Quadrophenia for the Prince's Trust concert at Hyde Park, London. Daltrey agreed to help produce a one-off performance. The opera was performed with a large backing band. On the night before the show, Daltrey was struck in the face by a microphone stand swung by Gary Glitter. The accident fractured his eye socket and caused considerable concern that he might not be able to perform safely, but Daltrey donned an eye-patch to cover the bruises and completed the show as scheduled. Afterward, Townshend decided to take the production on tour in 1996–97 as the Who.

After the success of their Quadrophenia tour, the band returned as the Who in a stripped-down, five-piece line-up for tours in 1999–2000. The band continued to work together, making a major impact at the Concert for New York City. After Entwistle's death in June 2002, both Daltrey and Townshend decided to continue with an already planned tour as the Who. Bass player Pino Palladino was chosen to fill Entwistle's place. The band also completed a brief tour in 2004. In 2006, they released their first studio album of new material in twenty-four years, Endless Wire, leading some fans and critics to say that the much-discussed artistic tension within the Who lay between Daltrey and Townshend. The band completed a world tour in 2006–07 to support this album.

In February 2010, Townshend and Daltrey, headlining as the Who, performed the half-time show at Super Bowl XLIV in front of 105.97 million viewers across the globe. In March 2010, Townshend and Daltrey, along with an extensive backing band, performed Quadrophenia at the Royal Albert Hall in London as a tenth anniversary charity benefit for the Teenage Cancer Trust. Eddie Vedder of Pearl Jam sang the part of the Godfather and Tom Meighan of Kasabian sang the part of Aceface.

Songwriting 
Daltrey wrote a handful of songs in the band's catalogue during their early years:
"Anyway, Anyhow, Anywhere" (1965) – The Who's second single, co-written with Townshend.
"See My Way" (1966) – Daltrey's contribution to A Quick One.
"Early Morning Cold Taxi" (1967) – Outtake from The Who Sell Out (later appearing as a bonus track on deluxe editions), co-written with David "Cyrano" Langston.
"Here for More" (1970) – B-side to "The Seeker".

Daltrey also wrote a song entitled "Crossroads Now" for the Who. It grew from an onstage jam session in 1999. Another Daltrey song, "Certified Rose", was rehearsed by the Who shortly before the death of John Entwistle. The band had planned on playing it (as well as Townshend's "Real Good Looking Boy") during their 2002 tour, but plans were halted after Entwistle's death. Although it was rumoured that a studio version was recorded during the Endless Wire sessions (and may have featured Entwistle's basslines from 2002), Townshend later stated that no such recording was made. A more recent recording of "Certified Rose" was released on Daltrey's 2018 album, As Long As I Have You.

"Early Morning Cold Taxi" is a song recorded during The Who Sell Out recording sessions in 1967. It was released in 1994 on the Thirty Years of Maximum R&B box set. It is credited to Daltrey and Who roadie Dave "Cyrano" Langston.

Solo career

Overview

Daltrey has released eight solo studio albums. The first was Daltrey in 1973, recorded during a hiatus in the Who's touring schedule. The best-selling single from the album, "Giving It All Away", peaked at No. 5 in the UK and the album, which introduced Leo Sayer as a songwriter, made the Top 50 in the United States. The inner sleeve photography showed a trompe-l'œil in reference to the Narcissus myth, as Daltrey's reflection in the water differs from his real appearance. He also released a single in 1973, "Thinking", with "There is Love" as the B-side. The British release, with considerable airplay of "Giving It All Away" (first lines "I paid all my dues so I picked up my shoes, I got up and walked away") coincided with news reports of the Who being sued for unpaid damage to their hotel on a recent tour, including a TV set being thrown out of the window.

Daltrey's second solo album Ride a Rock Horse was released in 1975, and is his second most commercially successful solo album.

McVicar was billed as a soundtrack album for the film of the same name, in which Daltrey starred and also co-produced. It featured all the other members of the Who at the time (Townshend, Entwistle, and Kenney Jones). McVicar included two hit singles, "Free Me", and "Without Your Love", which is Daltrey's best-selling solo recording.

On release, Parting Should Be Painless received negative critical reviews, and was Daltrey's poorest-selling studio album up to that point. The album was a concerted effort on Daltrey's part to vent his frustrations in the wake of the Who's break-up by assembling a set of roughly autobiographical songs. These included a track contributed by Bryan Ferry ("Going Strong"), and one contributed by Eurythmics ("Somebody Told Me"). Musically, according to Daltrey the album covered areas that he had wanted the Who to pursue.

The title track to Under a Raging Moon is a tribute to late Who drummer Keith Moon, who had died in 1978 at the premature age of 32. On his next album Rocks in the Head, Daltrey's voice ranges from a powerful bluesy growl à la Howlin' Wolf to the tender vocals shared with his daughter Willow on the ballad "Everything a Heart Could Ever Want". This was his first major effort as a songwriter for his own solo career.

Daltrey appeared in the Freddie Mercury Tribute Concert in 1992, singing the hard rock Queen song "I Want It All", to pay homage to his friend Freddie Mercury, who died the previous year one day after a public announcement that he suffered from AIDS.

To celebrate his 50th birthday in 1994, Daltrey performed two shows at Carnegie Hall. A recording of the concerts was later issued on CD and video; it was entitled A Celebration: The Music of Pete Townshend and The Who, and is sometimes called Daltrey Sings Townshend. The success of these two shows led to a US tour by the same name, featuring Pete Townshend's brother Simon on lead guitar with Phil Spalding taking bass duties for the first half of each show, and John Entwistle playing for the second half. An Australian leg was considered but eventually scrapped.

An avid fan of Premier League football club Arsenal F.C., Daltrey wrote and performed a specially commissioned song, "Highbury Highs", for the 2006 Highbury Farewell ceremony following the final football match at Highbury. Daltrey's performance was part of Arsenal's celebration of the previous 93 years at Highbury as the club prepared for their move to the Emirates Stadium the following season.

Daltrey embarked on a solo tour of the US and Canada on 10 October 2009, officially called the "Use It or Lose It" tour with a new touring band he called "No Plan B" on the Alan Titchmarsh Show. The band included Simon Townshend on rhythm guitar and backing vocals, Frank Simes on lead guitar, Jon Button on bass guitar, Loren Gold on keyboards, and Scott Devours on drums. Eddie Vedder made a guest appearance at the Seattle show on 12 October. In 2010, Daltrey and No Plan B appeared for several dates with Eric Clapton, including Summerfest at Milwaukee, Wisconsin.

On 15 March 2018, Daltrey announced the forthcoming release, on 1 June, of his new solo studio album As Long as I Have You. He appeared on BBC One's The Graham Norton Show, on 13 April 2018, to promote the single taken from the album.

In May 2021, Daltrey announced a return to touring, with the solo Live and Kicking Tour, starting in August 2021. The tour was rescheduled and carried out during the summer of 2022.

Discography

Solo
 Daltrey (1973)
 Ride a Rock Horse (1975)
 One of the Boys (1977)
 McVicar (1980)
 Parting Should Be Painless (1984)
 Under a Raging Moon (1985)
 Can't Wait to See the Movie (1987)
 Rocks in the Head (1992)
 As Long as I Have You (2018)

Collaborations with other artists
 Going Back Home (2014) (with former Dr. Feelgood guitarist Wilko Johnson)

Other recordings
 Tommy (1972) (LSO version)
 Tommy (1975) (soundtrack)
 Lisztomania (1975) (soundtrack)

Collaborations
In 1998, Daltrey performed two songs with the Jim Byrnes Blues Band at the Los Angeles Highlander Convention.

On 12 January 2009, Daltrey headlined a one-off concert along with Babyshambles at the O2 Academy Bristol for Teenage Cancer Trust. On 5 July 2009, he joined the Jam's lead singer, Paul Weller on stage at Hop Farm Festival in Kent for an encore of "Magic Bus". In 2011, Daltrey recorded a duet on the song "Ma seule amour" with French singer and composer Laurent Voulzy for his album Lys and Love.

In November 2014, while staying at the Mar Hall Hotel in Bishopton, Renfrewshire – ahead of the Who's gig at the SSE Hydro – Daltrey joined the band Milestone for an impromptu rendition of "I Can't Explain". The band were playing at a wedding reception in the hotel.

Legacy 

According to Pete Townshend, Daltrey "almost invented the pseudo-messianic role taken up later by Jim Morrison and Robert Plant." His persona has earned him a position as one of the "gods of rock and roll". He developed a trademark move of swinging and throwing his microphone through a complex sequence, matching these sequences with the tempo of the song that was being played at the moment, although Daltrey reduced the athleticism of his performances in later years. According to a review of the Who's performance at the Quart Festival in 2007:

Suddenly each and everyone stopped caring about the down-pouring rain. When the Who took the stage we couldn't do anything but to reach for the sky and howl. Anyone who has ever thought of calling these gods old men and dinosaurs should be deeply ashamed. The reports we've heard from around the world were true: Live rock doesn't get any better.

Equipment 

Daltrey hand-built his first guitar from a piece of plywood, and also built guitars for the band in the early days when they had little money to buy equipment. As lead guitarist for the Detours, Daltrey played a 1961 Epiphone Wilshire solid-body electric guitar, which he later sold to Pete Townshend on an easy payment plan. After he took over vocals for the band in the 1960s, and during the 1970s, Daltrey rarely played guitar on stage, except for a Martin acoustic guitar while promoting his solo album Daltrey. He began playing guitar with the Who again during the band's tours in the 1980s, and used a Fender Esquire to play a second guitar part for the song "Eminence Front" on the Who's 1982, 1989 and later tours. During the 1989 tour, Daltrey played a Gibson Chet Atkins SST guitar for the song "Hey Joe". During the Who's 1996–97 Quadrophenia tour, he played a Gibson J-200 acoustic guitar.

After 1999, it became more common for Daltrey to play guitar during both the Who and solo shows. He played a Versoul Buxom 6 handmade acoustic guitar on the Who's 2002 tour. Daltrey owns a Gibson Everly Brothers Flattop acoustic guitar which he played on the Who and solo tours in the late first decade of the 21st century. On his 2009 tour, he played Pete Townshend's "Blue, Red and Grey" on an Ashbury cutaway tenor EQ ukulele.

Daltrey is among those who first brought the harmonica into popular music. Although those he uses have varied over the years, harmonica brands he has used include Hohner and Lee Oskar.

Daltrey uses Shure microphones with cords that are taped to reinforce the connection and avoid cutting his hands when he swings and catches the microphone. He commonly uses a standard Shure SM58, but has also used Shure SM78 (in 1981), Shure model 565D Unisphere 1, and Shure model 548 Unidyne IV. Daltrey also uses a hybrid monitoring system, with one in-ear monitor supplemented by floor wedges.

Acting career

Literary work
Daltrey contributed to a collection of childhood fishing stories published in 1996 entitled I Remember: Reflections on Fishing in Childhood. In 2009, he contributed a foreword to Anyway, Anyhow, Anywhere: The Complete Chronicle of The Who 1958–1978 by Andrew Neill and Matt Kent. In 2011, he wrote a tribute article in honour of the late Ken Russell which was published in Britain's Daily Express. In October 2018, he published his memoir, Thanks a Lot Mr. Kibblewhite: My Story. The title is a reference to the man who threw him out of grammar school, enabling him to go into a successful music career.

Awards and achievements 
In 1976, Daltrey was nominated for a Golden Globe Award for "Best Acting Debut in a Motion Picture" for his starring role in the film version of the Who's rock opera Tommy. He also performed as a guest on the Chieftains' recording of Irish Evening: Live at the Grand Opera House which won a Grammy Award for Best Traditional Folk Album in 1993. With the Who, Daltrey received a Grammy Lifetime Achievement Award in 2001 for outstanding artistic significance in music.

In 1990, Daltrey was inducted into the Rock and Roll Hall of Fame in Cleveland, Ohio as a member of the Who. The Rock and Roll Hall of Fame also included three songs that Daltrey recorded with the Who on the list of 500 Songs that Shaped Rock and Roll, including: "My Generation", "Go to the Mirror!", and "Baba O'Riley". In 2005, Daltrey received a British Academy of Songwriters, Composers and Authors Gold Badge Award for special and lasting contributions to the British entertainment industry.

In 2003, Daltrey was honoured by Time magazine as a European Hero for his work with the Teenage Cancer Trust and other charities. In the New Year's Honours List published on 31 December 2004, he was appointed a Commander of the Order of the British Empire for services to Music, the Entertainment Industry and Charity.

As a member of the Who, Daltrey was inducted in 2005 into the UK Music Hall of Fame. In December 2008, he and Pete Townshend were honoured with America's most prestigious cultural awards as recipients of the 31st annual Kennedy Center Honors in Washington, D.C., by then-president of the United States, George W. Bush. On 4 March 2009, three days after his 65th birthday, Daltrey accepted the James Joyce Award from the Literary and Historical Society of University College Dublin for outstanding success in the music field.

On 12 March 2011, he received the Steiger Award (Germany) for excellence in music. In November 2011, Daltrey and Pete Townshend received the Classic Album Award for Quadrophenia from the Classic Rock Roll of Honour Awards at the Roundhouse in London.

In July 2012, Daltrey received an honorary degree from Middlesex University in recognition of his contributions to music.

Daltrey has received numerous awards for his music, including Best Blues Album in the British Blues Awards 2015 alongside Wilko Johnson.

In 2019, Daltrey was the recipient of the Golden Plate Award of the American Academy of Achievement. He received his Golden Plate along with Pete Townshend and presented by Awards Council member Peter Gabriel.

Charities

All of the Who's Encore Series profits go to young people's charities. Daltrey was instrumental in starting the Teenage Cancer Trust concert series in 2000, with the Who actually playing in 2000, 2002, 2004, 2007, and 2010, and Daltrey playing solo in 2011, and in 2015 as the Who. The annual concerts have raised over £20 million. He has endorsed the Whodlums, a Who tribute band which raise money for the trust.

Daltrey performed at the first ChildLine Rocks concert at London's the O2 on 13 March 2008. In 2009, Daltrey was a judge for the 8th annual Independent Music Awards to support independent artists. In the same year, he appeared again on stage with Michael J. Fox for the "A Funny Thing Happened on the Way to Cure Parkinson's" benefit. In April 2010, he headlined the Imagine A Cure II show honouring the legacy of John Lennon, which raised money for the Puget Sound Affiliate of Susan G. Komen for the Cure breast cancer charity. In 2011, Daltrey became a patron of the Children's Respite Trust for children with disabilities.

In 2011, Daltrey, Steven Tyler, and Julie Andrews provided funding for Robert S. Langer's research at the Massachusetts Institute of Technology into vocal cord repair for victims of cancer and other disorders. On 4 November 2011, Daltrey and Pete Townshend launched the Daltrey/Townshend Teen and Young Adult Cancer Programme at the Ronald Reagan UCLA Medical Center in Los Angeles, to be funded by the Who's charity Teen Cancer America. The launch, followed on 5 November by a fund-raising event, was also attended by Robert Plant, and Dave Grohl. Daltrey also announced that a portion of ticket sales from his solo tours would go to fund the teen cancer centres. In 2012, he offered his support to a project helping unemployed young people in Heathfield, run by Tomorrow's People Trust.

Political views 
In 1970, Daltrey publicly supported The National Campaign for Freedom of Information, saying: "I come from a working-class background and I am proud of it and I intend to fight for the workers' right to know. We all need to know what goes on behind the scenes that is causing this country's economic mess. When we have a Freedom of Information Act in this country we shall have restored our Right to Know the Truth and that will bring sanity to our tax laws."

Daltrey was previously a supporter of the British Labour Party, but he withdrew his endorsement citing his opposition to the "mass immigration" policies put in place under the Blair government. In 2018, he criticised Labour leader Jeremy Corbyn, describing him as a "communist".

Daltrey supported Britain leaving the European Union. He wrote in The Mirror: "Whatever happens our country should never fear the consequences of leaving. We went into the Common Market in 1973. Do you know what was going on before we went in? It was the 1960s. The most exciting time ever – Britain was Swinging. Films, Theatre, Fashion, Art and Music... Britain was the centre of the world. You got that because Britain was doing its own thing. It was independent. Not sure we'll ever get that again when we're ruled by bureaucrats in the European Union." He again criticised the EU in 2019, saying, "If you want to be signed up to be ruled by a fucking mafia, you do it. Like being governed by FIFA".

In 2017, Daltrey opined that a "dead dog" could have defeated Hillary Clinton in the 2016 United States presidential election. In 2018, he denounced the MeToo movement, saying: "I find this whole thing so obnoxious. It's always allegations and it's just salacious crap."

In 2021, Daltrey criticised the rise of woke culture in an interview with Zane Lowe's Apple Music 1 podcast, arguing that younger generations are limiting themselves by stifling and undoing creative freedoms that had emerged through the artistic revolutions of the 1960s. He elaborated by stating "it's terrifying, the miserable world they're going to create for themselves. I mean, anyone who's lived a life and you see what they're doing, you just know that it's a route to nowhere."

Personal life
Daltrey has been married twice. In 1964, he married Jacqueline "Jackie" Rickman, and later that year the couple had their son Simon; they divorced in 1968. In 1967, another son, Mathias, was the result of his affair with Swedish model Elisabeth Aronsson. In 1968 he met Heather Taylor, a model who was born in the UK, living with her grandmother at the time, and the subject of the 1967 Jimi Hendrix song "Foxy Lady". Daltrey and Taylor were introduced by her friend, who knew she was down after a recent break-up.  Daltrey and Taylor have been married since 1971, and have three children together: daughters Rosie Lea (born in 1972) and Willow Amber (born in 1975), and son Jamie (born in 1981), who runs Daltrey's trout farm outside Burwash Common.

On 1 March 1994 – the day of his 50th birthday – Daltrey received a letter from a woman claiming to be his daughter, from a brief relationship during the interval between his marriages. Within a few years, Daltrey met two more daughters born during this period in the late 1960s. All three girls had been adopted and grown to adulthood before meeting their biological father; Daltrey states that Heather joined him in welcoming the three daughters to their extended family. As well as his eight children, Daltrey has fifteen grandchildren.

In 1971, Daltrey bought a farm at Holmshurst Manor, near Burwash, Sussex.

Roger has announced onstage that he is now "very, very deaf," suffering hearing loss due to exposure to loud volume levels during performances. In the 2018 article discussing this revelation, the Daily Mirror reported that he urged audience members to use ear plugs. Bandmate Pete Townshend has also publicly detailed his own hearing loss. 

In 1978, during the recording of the Who's album Who Are You, Daltrey had throat surgery to remove nodules after an infection. During a solo tour in 2009, Daltrey began finding it harder to reach the high notes. In December 2010, he was diagnosed with vocal cord dysplasia, and consulted Steven M. Zeitels, director of the Massachusetts General Hospital Voice Center and professor at Harvard Medical School. Zeitels performed laser surgery to remove the possibly pre-cancerous growth. Both surgeries were considered successful. As dysplasia recurs Daltrey has regular checks to monitor his condition. Daltrey has an allergy to cannabis that affects his singing voice; when second-hand marijuana smoke from an audience has impacted his performance, he has occasionally interrupted the concert to request that people not smoke it. Daltrey has stated that he has never taken hard drugs.

Daltrey is a supporter of Arsenal F.C.

References

Further reading
Roger Daltrey, 2018. Thanks A Lot Mr Kibblewhite: My Story, Blink Publishing; Henry Holt & Co 
Steve Huey, Roger Daltrey – Biography, [ AllMusic.com]
David M. Barling, Biography of Roger Daltrey, Archived extract at Wayback MachinegeExternal links

Roger Daltrey interview in Dallas in 1975 from Texas Archive of the Moving Image

1944 births
20th-century English male actors
21st-century English male actors
20th-century English male singers
21st-century English male singers
Atco Records artists
Atlantic Records artists
British harmonica players
British rhythm and blues boom musicians
British soft rock musicians
Cancer fundraisers
Commanders of the Order of the British Empire
Decca Records artists
English film producers
English male film actors
English male singer-songwriters
English rock musicians
English rock singers
Grammy Lifetime Achievement Award winners
Kennedy Center honorees
Living people
No Plan B (band) members
People educated at Acton County Grammar School
People from Shepherd's Bush
Polydor Records artists
Singers from London
The Who members
People from Burwash
British Eurosceptics